Difficult to Cure is the fifth studio album by the British hard rock band Rainbow, released in 1981. The album marked the further commercialization of the band's sound, with Ritchie Blackmore once describing at the time his appreciation of the band Foreigner. It became the band's highest-charting album on the UK Albums Chart, where it peaked at number three.

Recording
The album material was started with singer Graham Bonnet still in the band, getting as far as recording an early version of "I Surrender", before Bonnet left the band due to his dissatisfaction over the material, and numerous fallouts with Blackmore. American singer Joe Lynn Turner, formerly of Fandango was recruited and sang over already completed musical tracks. Turner stated that, because of this, he was singing in higher keys than he would do normally (and would do subsequently).

Release
The album's cover (designed by Hipgnosis) had originally been proposed for use on Black Sabbath's 1978 release Never Say Die!.
"I Surrender" would be the band's highest charting single in the UK, reaching No. 3.

The original 1981 LP and cassette releases had the title of the fifth track as "Vielleicht Das Nachster Zeit (Maybe Next Time)". This was a mis-translation from the German, which was corrected on later releases.  However, the "corrected" version still is not perfectly grammatical, as the correct German for "Maybe Next Time" is "Vielleicht nächstes Mal".

The laughter at the end of the last track is a sample of Oliver Hardy. On the original LP, the laughter is an endless loop as it plays in the run-out groove, while on CD it loops a few times before fading out.

A remastered CD reissue was released in May 1999, with packaging duplicating the original vinyl release.

Track listing

Personnel
Rainbow
Ritchie Blackmore – guitar
Don Airey – keyboards
Roger Glover – bass, producer
Bob Rondinelli – drums
Joe Lynn Turner – lead & backup vocals

Production
Flemming Rasmussen – engineer
Thomas Brekling, Clay Hutchinson – assistant engineers
Greg Calbi – mastering

Charts 
 

Album

Singles

Certifications

References

Rainbow (rock band) albums
1981 albums
Albums with cover art by Hipgnosis
Polydor Records albums
Albums produced by Roger Glover